Waleed Saleh Al-Bekheet (born 4 April 1965) is a Kuwaiti former hammer thrower who competed at the 1988 and 1992 Summer Olympics, finishing in 27th and 25th, respectively. He is the 1993 Arab champion, and later competed at the 1995 World Championships in Gothenburg.

He later became an assistant throwing coach with the Kuwait Athletics Federation in 1999.

Personal best
 Hammer throw – 69.42 m (1989, Kuwait City)

References

External links
 
 Waleed Al-Bekheet at Sports-Reference
 
 Waleed Al-Bekheet profile at hammer-ali.com

Living people
1965 births
Kuwaiti male hammer throwers
Olympic athletes of Kuwait
Athletes (track and field) at the 1988 Summer Olympics
Athletes (track and field) at the 1992 Summer Olympics
World Athletics Championships athletes for Kuwait
Athletes (track and field) at the 1994 Asian Games
Asian Games competitors for Kuwait